Pilea pollicaris is a species of plant in the family Urticaceae. It is endemic to Mauritius.  Its natural habitat is subtropical or tropical dry forests.

References

pollicaris
Endemic flora of Mauritius
Critically endangered plants
Taxonomy articles created by Polbot